Prime (styled as PRIME) is a range of sports drinks, drink mixes, and energy drinks created and marketed by Prime Hydration, LLC.

The brand is promoted and partially owned by Logan Paul and KSI.

History 
On January 4, 2022, Logan Paul and KSI announced together on a live Instagram feed that they had founded a new drinks company known as Prime Hydration.

Products 

Prime Hydration, LLC is affiliated with Congo Brands, co-owned by American businessmen Max Clemons and Trey Steiger.

The Prime brand is used on sports drinks, drink mixes, and energy drinks.

The hydration version is sold in Blue Raspberry, Grape, Ice Pop, Lemon Lime, Meta Moon, Orange, Strawberry Watermelon and Tropical Punch. The energy version, launched in 2023, is sold in Blue Raspberry, Lemon Lime, Orange Mango, Strawberry Watermelon, and Tropical Punch. Prime is made up of 10 percent coconut water and contains electrolytes, B vitamins and BCAAs.  The manufacturers also state that it has zero added sugar or caffeine and has around 20 calories per bottle. The drink is sweetened with acesulfame potassium and sucralose, like many other sugar-free drinks.

Advertising 
Prime was the sponsor for Timmy Hill's number 13 car for the NASCAR circuit. In July 2022, Premier League club Arsenal announced a joint marketing agreement with the company, with Prime becoming the official sports drink supplier for the club.  In their official statement they said it meant they have "access to talent and footballers which they do leverage in some of their marketing". In January 2023, the Ultimate Fighting Championship (UFC) announced a joint marketing agreement with the company, with Prime becoming the official sports drink supplier for the Mixed Martial Arts (MMA) promotion company. In February 2023, Prime was promoted on the Super Bowl LVII commercials, (costing 6-7 million USD).

Reception 
The drink has been resold online on eBay. Sky News reported that the release of the drink has sparked "chaotic scenes" at Asda, Aldi and Sainsbury's supermarkets in the United Kingdom. 

Mary McCarthy of The Independent said that KSI and Logan Paul were "monetising misogyny" and criticized them for the amount of influence they had on young boys.

Gordon Ramsay reviewed the tropical punch flavor on Heart radio, describing it as "like swallowing perfume", and giving it 0/10. Boxer Chris Eubank Jr also tried the drink saying "It's very sweet, I mean it says it's naturally flavoured. It doesn't taste bad, but it's not a natural flavour of drink".

References 

American drink brands
British drink brands
Energy drinks
Food and drink introduced in 2022
KSI
Logan Paul
Sports drinks